Breaking the Chains is the debut studio album by American heavy metal band Dokken. It was originally released in Europe as Breakin' the Chains on the French label Carrere Records, in 1981. This version contains different mixes and titles of songs from the later U.S. edition. "Paris Is Burning" is called "Paris", and is actually a studio version as opposed to the live recording in Berlin from December 1982. The album also contains a song called "We're Illegal", which later turned into "Live to Rock (Rock to Live)".

The album was remixed, partially re-recorded, renamed and released in the US in 1983 by Elektra Records, and reached number 136 on the Billboard 200 chart. The album was considered a flop by the label, which had the intention to drop the band. However, Dokken management convinced Elektra that they could make a more successful album, which materialized in Tooth and Nail in September 1984. Breaking the Chains''' title track was named the 62nd greatest hard rock song by VH1. It is featured on the radio station "V-ROCK" in the 2006 video game Grand Theft Auto: Vice City Stories.

In a discussion with George Lynch on January 26, 2011, he mentioned the existence of 500 copies of the Carrere Records Breakin' the Chains version printed with the Don Dokken moniker, instead of Dokken. This version also featured different album cover art.

Track listing

1981 Breakin' the Chains (Carrere Records)

1983 Breaking the Chains (Elektra Records)

Personnel
Band members
Don Dokken – lead vocals, rhythm and lead guitar
George Lynch – lead guitar
Mick Brown – drums
Juan Croucier – bass, background vocals, co-lead vocals on "We're Illegal"

Production
Michael Wagener – production, engineering, mixing
Wyn Davis – mixing
Joe Gastwirt – mastering
Peter Baltes – additional bass

Notes

On the original Breakin' the Chains'' Carrere version, released under the band name Don Dokken, several song titles are misspelled on the back cover. Namely "I Can't See You" ("I Can See You"), "Stick to Your Guns" ("Still to Your Guns"), and "Young Girls" ("Young Girl"). On the French Carrere vinyl release, the songs are spelled correctly, but George Lynch's name is misspelled as "Georges Lynch".

Charts

References

1981 debut albums
Albums produced by Michael Wagener
Dokken albums
Elektra Records albums
Carrere Records albums